Heinrich Ferdinand Wüstenfeld (31 July 1808 – 8 February 1899) was a German orientalist, known as a literary historian of Arabic literature, born at Münden, Hanover.

He studied theology and oriental languages at Göttingen and Berlin. He taught at Göttingen, becoming a professor there (1842–90). He published many important Arabic texts and valuable works on Arabic history.

Writings and translations

Navavi, Liber concinnitatis nominum (1832)
 (1833–34)
 (1835)
Ibn Challikan, Vitae illustrium virorum (1835–50)
Geschichte der Arabischen Ärzte und Naturforscher (1840)
Navavi, Tahdhib al-Asma, Biographical dictionary of illustrious men (4 bd, 1842–47)
The biographical dictionary of illustrious men, chiefly at the beginning of Islamism; now first ed. from the collation of two mss. at Göttingen and Leiden (1842)
Makrizi, Geschichte der Kopten (1846)
Zakariya al-Qazwini, ‘Aja'ib al-makhluqat, Zakarija Ben Muhammed Ben Mahmud el-Cazwini's Kosmographie (2 vols, 1849)
Ibn Coteiba, Handbuch der Geschichte (1850)
Genealogische Tabellen der arabischen Stämme und Familien (1852)
Register zu den genealogischen Tabellen der arabischen Stämme und Familien (1853)
Ibn Dorejd, Kitab ul-Ishtiqaq, Genealogisch-etymologisches Handbuch (2 bd, 1854)
Vergleichungstabellen der mohammedanischen und christlichen Zeitrechnung (1854)
Ibn Hischam, Das Leben Mohammeds (4 bd. 1857-60)
 Das Leben Muhammed's nach Muhammed Ibn Ishâk; (1858),  Volume: v.01 pt.01
Das Leben Muhammed's nach Muhammed Ibn Ishâk; (1859),  Volume: v.01 pt.02
Das Leben Muhammed's nach Muhammed Ibn Ishâk; (1860), Volume: 02
Geschichte der Stadt Medina (1860)
Chroniken der Stadt Mekka (4 bd, 1857–61)
Jakut, Geographisches Wörterbuch (6 bd, 1866–73)
Bahrein und Jemàma. Nach Arabischen Geographen beschrieben (1874)
Die Statthalter von Agypten (1876)
 
Das Heerwesen der Muhammedaner (1880)
Geschichte der Fatimiden-Chalifen. Nach arabischen Quellen (1881) reprinted 1976
Die Geschichtschreiber der Araber und ihre Werke. (1882)
Die Çufiten in Süd-Arabien im XI. (XVII.) Jahrhundert (1882) (1883)
Der Imam el-Schäfii und seine Anhänger (1889–91)

References 

 

1808 births
1899 deaths
Writers from Hanover
German orientalists
Academic staff of the University of Göttingen
German male non-fiction writers